Kirchhoff & Rose was an architectural firm in Milwaukee, Wisconsin. The partnership began in 1894 between Charles Kirchhoff Jr. and Thomas Leslie Rose.

Several of their works are listed on the National Register of Historic Places.

Works
Selected works include (with individual or joint attribution):
Palace Theatre (New York City)
Herman Uihlein House, 5270 N. Lake Dr., Whitefish Bay, WI (Kirchhoff & Rose), NRHP-listed
Joseph E. Uihlein mansion on Lake Shore Drive
Majestic Office Building and Theatre
Schlitz Palm Garden and Hotel
Joseph Schlitz Brewing Company Saloon, 2414 S. St. Clair St. Milwaukee, WI (Kirchhoff, Charles), NRHP-listed 
Tivoli Palm Garden, 500 W. National Ave. Milwaukee, WI, 1901, (Kirchhoff, Charles), part of Walker's Point Historic District.
Pawling & Harnischfeger’s Plant
Second Ward Savings Bank, now the Milwaukee County Historical Center, 910 N. 3rd St. Milwaukee, WI (Kirchhoff, Charles), NRHP-listed
Schuster's Department Store at 2151 N. King Dr.
Harley-Davidson Motor Company Factory No. 7 at 228 South 1st St., 1912, (Kirchhoff & Rose), NRHP-listed.
Blue Mound Golf and Country Club Clubhouse at 10122 West North Avenue, Wauwatosa, WI.
Bishop's manse, of the Cathedral Church of All Saints, Milwaukee, (Krichoff & Rose), NRHP-listed
Wauwatosa Woman's Club Clubhouse, 1626 Wauwatosa Ave. Wauwatosa, WI (Kirchhoff & Rose), NRHP-listed
Mount Olive Lutheran Church at 5327 W. Washington Blvd, Milwaukee. 1923.

References

Defunct architecture firms based in Wisconsin
Companies based in Milwaukee
Defunct companies based in Milwaukee